MTV Hits is a music video-only spin-off cable/satellite television channel of MTV in several international markets, originally based on the pop music format of a defunct programming block on the American MTV itself. It may refer to the following channels:

MTV Hits (Australian and New Zealand TV channel)
MTV Hits (British and Irish TV channel)
MTV Hits (European TV channel)
MTV Hits (French TV channel)
MTV Hits (Latin American TV channel)
NickMusic, an American channel formerly known as MTV Hits from May 1, 2002 until September 9, 2016
VH1 MegaHits, a Brazilian channel formerly known as MTV Hits from 2002 until 2010